Michael Kirk (born February 12, 1994) is an American soccer player.

Career

College and amateur
Kirk played four years of college soccer at La Salle University between 2012 and 2016.

Kirk also played with Premier Development League side Ocean City Nor'easters in 2016.

Professional
Kirk signed his first professional deal with United Soccer League club Rio Grande Valley FC Toros in 2017, but didn't make a first team appearance. Kirk joined USL side Pittsburgh Riverhounds on January 26, 2018.

Kirk joined USL League One side Lansing Ingite ahead of their inaugural 2019 season.

References

External links 
 

1994 births
Living people
American soccer players
Association football goalkeepers
La Salle Explorers men's soccer players
Lansing Ignite FC players
Ocean City Nor'easters players
People from Mechanicsburg, Pennsylvania
Pittsburgh Riverhounds SC players
Rio Grande Valley FC Toros players
Soccer players from Pennsylvania
USL Championship players
USL League One players
USL League Two players